The 2008 CAF Super Cup was the 16th CAF Super Cup, an annual football match in Africa organized by the Confederation of African Football (CAF), between the winners of the previous season's two CAF club competitions, the CAF Champions League and the CAF Confederation Cup. The match was contested by 2007 CAF Champions League winners, ES Sahel, and 2007 CAF Confederation Cup winners, CS Sfaxien at the Stade 14 January in Tunis on 23 February 2008.

This was only the third time that the African Super Cup was contested by teams from the same country (after all-Egyptian Super Cups in 1994 and 1997), and the first ever involving two Tunisian clubs.

Teams

Match details

See also
2007 CAF Champions League
2007 CAF Confederation Cup

Super
2008
Étoile Sportive du Sahel matches
CS Sfaxien matches